Wiraqucha (Quechua wira fat, qucha lake, wiraqucha or Wiraqucha mister, sir, gentleman; god; one of the greatest Andean divinities (Wiraqucha); the eighth emperor of the Tawantinsuyu (Wiraqucha Inka), Hispanicized spelling Huiracocha) is a mountain in the Andes of Peru, about  high. It is located in the Junín Region, Jauja Province, Canchayllo District. Wiraqucha lies east of the lakes named Llaksaqucha, Mankhaqucha and Chakip'aki (Chaquipaque), south of  Challwaqucha and north of the mountain named Chakip'aki. It is situated on the eastern border of the Nor Yauyos-Cochas Landscape Reserve.

References

Mountains of Peru
Mountains of Junín Region